Big Nate: In a Class by Himself (referred to as Big Nate: The Boy with the Biggest Head in the World in the United Kingdom, Ireland and Australia) is a children's fiction novel based on the Big Nate comic strip, written and illustrated by American cartoonist Lincoln Peirce. It is the first of the Big Nate novel series, followed by Big Nate Strikes Again. It was published on March 23, 2010, by HarperCollins and was nominated in 2011 for a Children's Choice Book Award by the Children's Book Council.

Plot
Nate Wright is dreaming when he wakes up to another ordinary morning of his life: breakfast of lumpy raisin oatmeal, his older sister, Ellen, and school. Believing that there will be a test that day after seeing his best friend Francis studying through his window, Nate becomes afraid of failing for his test and having to attend summer school. So he then attempts to forge an excuse note, only to be caught by his best friend Francis. Nate confesses to the forgery; Francis replies that there was no test scheduled for that day. At school, Nate realizes he forgot his lunch, so his second best friend, Teddy, gives Nate some fortune cookie and declares that he will share his lunch later. When he opens The fortune cookie it tells him that "TODAY YOU WILL SURPASS ALL OTHERS".

Despite not believing in fortune cookies due to their nonsensical meanings, Nate chooses to believe what the fortune claims. The school day starts off with advisory and Social Studies with Mrs. Godfrey, in which Nate makes up insulting names about Mrs. Godfrey, in which he is caught by the teacher whom he insulted and gets a detention slip. In English, Nate yells at his nemesis Gina for humiliating him for writing a love poem to his crush, Jenny, and is caught by Mrs. Clarke. During Mr. Rosa's art class, Nate sees that his Artur's picture received the spotlight instead of his own picture, causing Nate to attempt to convince Mr. Rosa to place Nate's picture in the spotlight instead. When Mr. Rosa refuses, Nate attempts to swap the pictures himself, only to get caught by Mr. Rosa and get his third detention slip of the day.

After that, Nate attempts to break a world record for speed-eating in the cafeteria by eating 60 hot dogs in 10 minutes and 45 slices of pizza in 10 minutes, only to discover that neither hot dogs nor pizza is being served that day. Instead, Nate is encouraged by his BFF, Francis, to eat 148 servings of green beans, one of Nate's least favorite foods, as no one eats their green beans at lunch. The record setting is cut when Principal Nichols notices the commotion and yells at Nate, causing him to spit the green beans in his mouth onto the floor. Principal Nichols then asks Nate to clean up the mess, before slipping in a puddle of juice, causing him to give Nate both a lecture and his 4th detention slip of the day.

As a result, Nate ends up being late for gym class. Nate attempts to wash the bean crud off his mouth, only for water to spill onto his gym shorts. Unable to find any other gym shorts, Nate grabs a pair of large shorts, which ends up belonging to the substitute gym teacher, Coach John. Because of this, Nate is forced by Coach John to run wind sprints and is given yet another detention slip.

In Math, Mr. Staples assigns a pop quiz, which Nate appears to just barely have finished with 10 minutes to spare. After time is up, Nate discovers that the quiz was double sided and that he'd only done the front side. Nate attempts to finish the back of the quiz, only to get caught by Mr. Staples. Mr. Staples attempts to take the quiz paper, but Nate refuses to hand it in unfinished, resulting in a "tug of war," causing it to rip, and also causing Nate to receive a detention slip from Mr. Staples.

During Science, Nate attempts to get Mr. Galvin to laugh using pranks, only for his pen to get confiscated. When the pen stains Mr. Galvin's shirt, Nate ends up laughing, prompting Mr. Galvin to give Nate his seventh and final detention slip of the day. At the end of the day Nate has to report to detention, only for Mrs. Czerwicki to inform Nate that he "surpassed all others" in P.S. 38 in receiving the most detention slips in one day. Upon realizing that his fortune "came true", Nate becomes happy, therefore leading to writing on his desk "NATE WRIGHT, SCHOOL RECORD HOLDER", disrespecting the "no writing on desks" rule.

Characters
 Nate Wright - The main protagonist; an egocentric, natives, and sarcastic sixth-grader.
 Teddy Ortiz - Nate's other best friend who enjoys making jokes at Nate's expense.
  Francis Pope - Nate's best friend, who is known for his high intelligence.
 Marty Wright "Dad" - Nate's somewhat clueless father, who plays golf and is known to make horrible food.
 Ellen Wright - Nate's fifteen-year-old older sister, who is the opposite of Nate. She is highly favored by Ms. Godfrey, as she was once her student.
 Mrs. Clara Godfrey - Nate's social studies teacher, who he dislikes (which is shown by his twenty nicknames). In the book, she gives Nate two detentions: for his list of nicknames for her and throwing a lemon square at her posterior and his dad's pie at Randy (though the latter was in a flashback and was actually by a kid named Randy Betancourt).
 Gina Hemphill-Toms - Nate's nemesis and Mrs. Godfrey's favorite student in the class.
 Jenny Jenkins - Nate's love interest, whom he met in first grade. However, Jenny does not return Nate's feelings and instead goes out with Artur for "four months, six days, and three-and-a-half-hours", according to Nate.
 Artur Pashkov - Jenny's boyfriend and Nate's frenemy; a Belarusian who speaks some broken English and unintentionally annoys Nate with his superiority and great luck. Artur is unaware of Nate's feelings toward him and considers him a friend. The two's "rivalry" began when Artur beat him in chess and knocked him down to the second-best chess player in the chess club.
  Principal Wesley Nichols - Nate's school principal. In the book, he gives Nate detention for wasting lunch servings of (green beans) by spitting them out and making Nichols slip on them.
 Coach John - A substitute gym teacher at Nate's school who loves to show off his injuries and is described by Nate as a "sergeant without a uniform". In the book, he gives Nate detention for wearing his own gym shorts during class (as he thought Nate was trying to ridicule him), when Nate actually just needed them, as he accidentally poured water on his own, while trying to wash green beans off his mouth.
 Ms. Clarke - Nate's English teacher, who gave him detention for shouting at Gina for ruining his love poem to Jenny.
 Mr. Staples - Nate's maths teacher, who gave him detention for not finishing and ripping his math test (though this was because Nate did not realize there was a back side of the test and did not have time to finish). He is known to tell corny knock-knock jokes.
 Mr. Galvin - Nate's science teacher, known to for his boring personality and lack of laughter, who gave him detention for laughing at the ink of Nate's confiscated cartooning pen (as Nate tried to make him laugh at his "Doctor Cesspool" comic strip, and his other previous failed attempts) getting all over his shirt.
 Mr. Ken Rosa - Nate's art teacher, who gave Nate detention for destroying the knob off the spotlight case (where students' pictures is selected to be in there), after his failed attempt to outshine Artur by putting his picture in there.
 Mrs. Shipulski - Principal Nichols's secretary.
 Mrs. Czerwicki - The sullen detention monitor.
 Randy Betancourt - A rival of Nate's who tried to steal food from a bake sale in a flashback.

Reception
Booklist and Publishers Weekly praised Big Nate: In a Class by Himself, with Publishers Weekly calling the character of Nate "sharp-witted and unflappable". Kirkus Reviews recommended the book as a read for "fans of Jeff Kinney's Wimpy Kid", stating that Pierce "skillfully and often hilariously imports his comic-strip character into a full-length story." The School Library Journal also gave the book a positive review, stating that "Kids will love Nate and all the trouble he gets into" and recommending it as a way to entice children into reading.

References

2010 American novels
American children's novels
Novels set in high schools and secondary schools
2010 children's books
Big Nate
HarperCollins books